2K20 may refer to:

 the year 2020
 "Beach 2k20", 2019 song by Robyn
 NBA 2K20, 2019 video game
 WWE 2K20, 2019 video game